Alan Eugene Magee (January 13, 1919 – December 20, 2003) was an American airman during World War II who survived a 22,000-foot (6,700 m) fall from his damaged B-17 Flying Fortress. He was featured in the 1981 Smithsonian Magazine as one of the 10 most amazing survival stories of World War II.

Military career and fall 
Immediately after the Pearl Harbor attack, Magee joined the United States Army Air Forces and was assigned as a ball turret gunner on a B-17 bomber.

On January 3, 1943, his Flying Fortress—B-17F-27-BO, 41-24620, nicknamed "Snap! Crackle! Pop!"—part of the 360th Bomb Squadron, 303rd Bomb Group, was on a daylight bombing run over Saint-Nazaire, France. This was Magee's seventh mission.

Magee left his ball turret when it became inoperative after being damaged by German flak, and discovered his parachute had been torn and rendered useless. Another flak hit then blew off a section of the right wing, causing the aircraft to enter a deadly spin. Magee, in the process of moving from the bomb bay to the radio room, blacked out from lack of oxygen because of the high altitude and was thrown clear of the aircraft. He fell over four miles before crashing through the glass roof of the St. Nazaire railroad station. The glass roof shattered, mitigating the force of Magee's impact. Rescuers found him on the floor of the station.

Magee was taken as a prisoner of war and given medical treatment by his captors. He had 28 shrapnel wounds in addition to his injuries from the fall: several broken bones, severe damage to his nose and eye, lung and kidney damage, and a nearly severed right arm.

Magee was liberated in May 1945 and received the Air Medal for meritorious conduct and the Purple Heart. On January 3, 1993, the 50th anniversary of the attack, the people of St. Nazaire honored Magee and the crew of his bomber by erecting a  memorial to them.

Personal life 

Magee was born in Plainfield, New Jersey, as the youngest of six children.

After the war, he earned his pilot's license and worked in the airline industry in a variety of roles. He retired in 1979 and moved to northern New Mexico. He died in San Angelo, Texas, on December 20, 2003, from stroke and kidney failure, at the age of 84.

See also

 Fall survivors
 Nicholas Alkemade, British Avro Lancaster B Mk. II crewman who survived falling from his burning aircraft in 1944
 Ivan Chisov, Soviet Air Force lieutenant who survived falling from his Ilyushin Il-4 bomber in 1942
 Juliane Koepcke, German teenager who survived a  fall after her Lockheed Electra flight broke up over the Peruvian Amazon.
 Vesna Vulović, Serbian flight attendant who survived the mid-air bombing of her McDonnell Douglas DC-9 in 1972 and holds the world record for surviving the highest fall without a parachute
 Other
 Freefall
 List of sole survivors of aviation accidents or incidents

References

External links
 Check-Six.com - The Free-Fall of Alan Magee

1919 births
2003 deaths
Deaths from kidney failure
Fall survivors
Recipients of the Air Medal
Survivors of aviation accidents or incidents
United States Army Air Forces soldiers
United States Army Air Forces personnel of World War II
World War II prisoners of war held by Germany
American prisoners of war in World War II